The Me 262 Project is a company formed to build flyable reproductions of the Messerschmitt Me 262, the world's first operational jet fighter. The project was started by the Texas Airplane Factory and administered by Classic Fighter Industries. It is based at Paine Field in Everett, Washington, United States, near Seattle. The project team of designers, engineers, and technicians completed the flight test program in 2012  and delivery of the first of five jets.

The aircraft are powered by General Electric CJ610 turbojet engines, concealed inside detailed reproductions of the original Junkers Jumo 004B engines and nacelles.

Production
Five aircraft were built:
 Me 262B-1c W.Nr.501241 reg.N262AZ
 Collings Foundation, Stow, Massachusetts, US, in flying condition. First replica to fly, 20 December 2002.

 Me 262B-1c W.Nr.501242
 Evergreen Aviation Museum, McMinnville, Oregon, US, on static museum display. In the markings of an aircraft of Jadgeschwader 7 (11/JG-7) based at Brandenburg-Briest, flown by Leutnant Alfred Ambs.

 Me 262A/B-1c W.Nr.501243 reg.N262MF
 Military Aviation Museum, Virginia Beach, Virginia, US, in airworthy condition.

 Me 262A/B-1c W.Nr.501244 reg.D-IMTT
 Messerschmitt Stiftung, Manching, Germany, in airworthy condition.

 Me 262A-1c W.Nr.501245

References

Notes

Bibliography

External links
 "Stormbird article" in Air & Space Smithsonian Magazine
 "NEW ME-262 REPRODUCTION LANDS AT THE MUSEUM" Evergreen Museum

Aerospace companies of the United States
Multinational aircraft manufacturers
Everett, Washington
Messerschmitt Me 262